Bernhard Knubel (2 March 1938 – 23 February 1973) was a West German rower who competed for the United Team of Germany in the 1960 Summer Olympics.

He was born in Brotdorf but his home town was Minden. In 1960, he was a crew member of the German boat that won the gold medal in the coxed pair event. He died in Gelsenkirchen in 1973 from cancer.

References

1938 births
1973 deaths
Olympic rowers of the United Team of Germany
Rowers at the 1960 Summer Olympics
Olympic gold medalists for the United Team of Germany
Olympic medalists in rowing
West German male rowers
Medalists at the 1960 Summer Olympics
People from Merzig-Wadern
Deaths from cancer in Germany
Sportspeople from Saarland
20th-century German people